Buotidae is a family of millipedes belonging to the order Chordeumatida. This family contains a single species, Buotus carolinus, which exhibits sexual dimorphism in segment number: the adult female has 28 segments, but the adult male has only 26, both fewer than the 30 usually found in this order (counting the collum as the first segment and the telson as the last). These millipedes are very small (no more than 4 mm in length) and have been found in the mountains of Virginia, West Virginia, and North Carolina.

Genera:
 Buotus Chamberlin, 1940

References

Chordeumatida
Millipede families